Reanerra is a five stone circle in County Cork in Ireland recorded by Aubrey Burl. It is among a large number of megalithic monuments in the area, such as Ardgroom.

References

Stone circles in Ireland
Neolithic sites
Archaeological sites in County Cork
Religion in County Cork